Gary Nathaniel Matthews Sr. (born July 5, 1950), nicknamed Sarge, is an American former professional baseball left fielder, who played in Major League Baseball (MLB) from  through   for the San Francisco Giants, Atlanta Braves, Philadelphia Phillies, Chicago Cubs, and Seattle Mariners. After his playing days, Matthews was a color commentator for Phillies broadcasts. He batted and threw right-handed. He is the father of former big league outfielder Gary Matthews Jr. The Matthews are one of seven father/son combinations in Cubs history; another son, Delvon, was a member of Milwaukee's Minor League Baseball (MiLB) system in –.

Playing career
Matthews was selected in the first round of the June 1968 draft by the San Francisco Giants. He began his professional career in 1969 playing for the Giants' Decatur Commodores (A) affiliate in Decatur, Illinois. In 1973, his first complete season, he won the National League Rookie of the Year award.

Matthews batted .281 during his 16-season major league career with San Francisco (1972–76), Atlanta (1977–80), Philadelphia (1981–83), the Chicago Cubs (1984–87) and Seattle (1987). He appeared in 2,033 games and recorded 2,011 hits, 234 homers and 978 RBI while scoring 1,083 runs. Matthews was the National League Rookie of the Year in 1973 after batting .300 with 12 homers and 58 RBI for the Giants. 

During the advent of MLB free agency, Matthews signed a five‐year, $1,875,000 contract with the Braves on November 17, 1976. The terms included an annual $100,000 salary, a $125,000 bonus, a $250,000 investment account, an offseason job with Braves owner Ted Turner worth $50,000, $200,000 in commissions for his agent and $450,000 in deferred payments that brought an additional $300,000 in interest. Turner's violation of free-agent rules in his pursuit of Matthews earned him a one-year suspension and the Braves were stripped of its first-round selection in the 1977 MLB draft. The denial of the draft pick was voided but Turner's suspension was upheld in Atlanta National League Baseball Club, Inc. v. Kuhn which was adjudicated on May 19, 1977. Matthews had his best overall season with the Braves in 1979, going to the All-Star Game during a season in which he batted .304 with 27 homers and 90 RBI.

Eligible to become a free agent again after the upcoming season, Matthews was acquired by the Phillies from the Braves for Bob Walk on March 25, 1981. He signed a five-year contract extension upon his arrival in Philadelphia. He saw postseason action with the Phillies in 1981 and 1983. He homered 7 times in 19 playoff games and was voted the MVP of the 1983 NLCS after leading the Phillies past Los Angeles into the World Series. In the 5-game series, he went 6-for-14 with three homers and eight RBIs. 

Matthews was traded along with Bob Dernier and Porfi Altamirano from the Phillies to the Cubs for Bill Campbell and Mike Diaz on March 27, 1984. He was a key contributor to the Cubs' NL Eastern Division title in 1984, batting .291 with 101 runs scored. In the first game of the 1984 NL Championship Series against San Diego, he homered twice. He spent three seasons as a starter in left field for the Cubs. Matthews was limited by injuries in 1987 before being traded in mid-season to Seattle for minor league pitcher Dave Hartnett.

In his 16-season career, Matthews batted .281 with 234 home runs and 978 RBIs in 2033 games. He finished with 183 career stolen bases, 1083 runs scored and 319 doubles. He had 2011 hits in 7147 at bats. He also exhibited plate discipline, with a lifetime .364 OBP, and a career high of .410. In 19 postseason games, he batted .323 with 7 home runs and 15 RBI. He posted a .968 fielding percentage as an outfielder.

Coaching career
After retiring as a player following the 1987 season, Matthews worked in private industry and broadcasting before joining the Cubs' organization in 1995 as minor league hitting coordinator, a position he held for three years. He left the Cubs in 1998 to become Toronto's hitting coach; he was a member of the Blue Jays' coaching staff for two years, then joined their broadcast team for two seasons. Matthews returned to the field in 2002 as Milwaukee's hitting coach and served as a coach for the Cubs in 2003–06.

Broadcast career

Matthews began his broadcast career as a radio commentator for the Toronto Blue Jays (2000–01) and as a studio analyst on Headline Sports Television, a Canadian cable network based in Toronto. After concluding his coaching career following the 2006 season, Matthews served as a color analyst for the Philadelphia Phillies from 2007 to 2013. During his first year in Philadelphia's booth, Matthews provided analysis for the entire game alongside Harry Kalas and Chris Wheeler (Kalas provided play-by-play for innings 1-3 and 7-9 while doing the 4th on radio and taking the 5th and 6th off. Wheeler relieved Kalas during the middle three innings while doing color analysis with Matthews the rest of the game). For the remainder of his Phillies broadcast tenure, Matthews provided analysis for only the middle three innings. Following Phillies victories from 2008 to 2011, Matthews would also conduct a brief on-field interview with a player who made a key contribution in that day's game.

On January 8, 2014, Matthews and Wheeler were relieved of their commentary duties with the Philadelphia Phillies. Both were assigned other jobs within the organization. Jamie Moyer and Matt Stairs were hired to replace them.

See also

 List of Major League Baseball career home run leaders
 List of Major League Baseball career hits leaders
 List of Major League Baseball career runs scored leaders
 List of Major League Baseball career stolen bases leaders

References

External links

Gary Matthews at SABR (Baseball BioProhect)
Gary Matthews at Baseball Gauge

1950 births
Living people
African-American baseball coaches
African-American baseball players
Amarillo Giants players
Atlanta Braves players
Baseball players from San Francisco
Chicago Cubs coaches
Chicago Cubs players
Decatur Commodores players
Fresno Giants players
Major League Baseball broadcasters
Major League Baseball first base coaches
Major League Baseball hitting coaches
Major League Baseball left fielders
Major League Baseball Rookie of the Year Award winners
Milwaukee Brewers coaches
National League All-Stars
Baseball coaches from California
Philadelphia Phillies announcers
Philadelphia Phillies players
Phoenix Giants players
San Francisco Giants players
Seattle Mariners players
Toronto Blue Jays announcers
Toronto Blue Jays coaches
People from San Fernando, California
National League Championship Series MVPs
21st-century African-American people
20th-century African-American sportspeople
San Fernando High School alumni